The 1962 Pittsburgh Panthers football team represented the University of Pittsburgh in the 1962 NCAA University Division football season.  The team compiled a 5–5 record under head coach John Michelosen. The team's statistical leaders included Jim Traficant with 611 passing yards and Rick Leeson with 481 rushing yards.

Schedule

References

Pittsburgh
Pittsburgh Panthers football seasons
Pittsburgh Panthers football